Kafi is one of the ten basic thaats of Hindustani music from the Indian subcontinent. It is also the name of a raga (Kharaharapriya) within this thaat.

Description
Kafi thaat makes use of the Komal Gandhara and Komal Nishad. So basically it adds Komal Gandhara to the Khamaj thaat. The Kafi raga is one of the oldest ragas and its intervals are described as the basic scale of the Natyashastra. Thus in ancient and medieval times, Kafi was considered as natural scale. Kafi is a late evening raga and said to convey the mood of springtime.

Ragas
Ragas in Kafi thaat include:

 Abhogi
 Bageshri
 Bageshri-Ang Chandrakauns
 Bahar
 Barwa
 Bhimpalasi
 Brindavani Sarang
 Dhani
 Hanskinkini
 Jog
 Kafi
 Megh
 Malhar
 Nayaki Kanada
 Patdeep
 Pilu
 Jaijaiwanti
 Ramdasi Malhar
 Sahana
 Surdasi Malhar

References

Hindustani music theory